Morikazu (written: 盛和 or 守一) is a masculine Japanese given name. Notable people with the name include:

 (1843–1890), Japanese politician and journalist
 (1917–2010), Japanese physicist

Japanese masculine given names